National Primary Route 23, or just Route 23 (or ) is a National Road Route of Costa Rica, located in the Puntarenas province.

Description
In Puntarenas province the route covers Puntarenas canton (Barranca, El Roble districts), Esparza canton (Caldera district).

References

Highways in Costa Rica